Warbreck railway station was on the North Liverpool Extension Line to the south of Walton Vale, Liverpool, England.

The purely passenger station opened on 1 August 1929 and closed on 7 November 1960. The through tracks were not lifted until 1980.

References

Sources

External links
Warbreck The station's history Disused Stations UK
The station and local lines on multiple maps Rail Maps Online
Station on a 1948 O.S. map npe Maps
Station and line HTS railwaycodes

Disused railway stations in Liverpool
Former Cheshire Lines Committee stations
Railway stations in Great Britain opened in 1929
Railway stations in Great Britain closed in 1960